The Aryan Republican Army (ARA), also dubbed "The Midwest Bank bandits" by the FBI and law-enforcement, was a white nationalist terrorist gang which robbed 22 banks in the Midwest from 1994 to 1996. The bank robberies were spearheaded by Donna Langan. The gang, who had links to Neo-Nazism and white supremacism, were alleged to have conspired with convicted terrorist Timothy McVeigh in the months before the Oklahoma City bombing terrorist attack. Although never legally acknowledged, many theorists believe the ARA funneled robbery money to help fund the bombing as a direct response to the Waco and Ruby Ridge sieges.

Inspired to rob banks in order to support white supremacist movements by Mark Thomas, the ARA, founded in 1992 by Langan and her best friend from school Richard Lee Guthrie Jr., considered itself a leaderless organization. Although the group was mainly a criminal enterprise, its agenda was terrorist like. After filming and producing right wing propaganda videos, the group grew and recruited bank robber affiliates: Michael Brescia, Shawn Kenny, Kevin McCarthy, and Scott Stedeford. With the bank heist money, the gang began to stockpile weapons and ammunition in preparation for a future race war. At bank after bank, the bandits became infamous due to the fact that they left their signature decoy grenades and their pipe bombs as calling cards, a strategy which was implemented to help the gang escape and delay the FBI's pursuit. The bandits used a strict time keeper who called out at elapsed intervals and made sure that they were in and out of the heists within 90 seconds. The time keeping, along with the members wearing of presidential masks, were moves which were believed to be lifted directly from the Kathryn Bigelow film Point Break. In addition to wearing Nixon, Reagan and Clinton masks, the ARA also wore jackets and hats emblazoned with "FBI," "ATF" or other law-enforcement acronyms.

The FBI was unaware of the existence of the ARA until one of its members was apprehended. In early 1996, the group began to fall apart as its members were arrested after former members of the group became informants as part of a plea bargain. Guthrie was arrested in Cincinnati on January 15, 1996, concluding a 2-hour chase by bureau agents. Soon after, Guthrie gave up his counterpart Langan. Three days later on January 18, 1996, the FBI arrested Langan after a 50-round shoot out near a safe house in Columbus, Ohio.

Activities 
Members of the Aryan Republican Army were responsible for a series of 22 bank robberies in the American Midwest. They reportedly targeted banks in the Midwest due to their belief that the security measures which were taken there would be less thorough. The group often left fake explosive devices at the banks which they robbed in order to divert law enforcement officials who could potentially chase them. Known members of the ARA include Langan, Guthrie, Michael William Brescia, Mark William Thomas, Shawn Kenny, Kevin McCarthy, and Scott Stedeford. Subsequent to their arrest, Guthrie, Langan, McCarthy and Thomas became witnesses for the prosecution. Guthrie was found hanged while in custody, a day before he was to give a television interview about an alleged cover-up which was related to the death of Kenneth Michael Trentadue, who was also found hanged while he was in custody. Otherwise, All of the gang's members received prison sentences of varying lengths, on an array of state and/or federal charges.

Connections to the Oklahoma City bombing
Several accounts have linked the ARA with Timothy McVeigh, convicted of the 1995 Oklahoma City bombing that killed 168 and injured hundreds more.

Brescia and Guthrie both resided for a time at Elohim City, Oklahoma, a private community made up of followers of the late Christian Identity pastor Robert G. Millar, and other persons associated with right-wing extremist and white nationalist-style views. Other ARA members were known to frequent Elohim City as well. Elohim City security director Andreas Strassmeir was a known associate of Timothy McVeigh (having met him at a Tulsa gun show), and federal investigators determined that McVeigh had made a phone call to Elohim City on April 5, 1995, just two weeks prior to the Oklahoma City bombing (although no one at Elohim City claims to have spoken with him).

Additionally, five separate women from a nightclub in Tulsa have each identified Brescia as the man who was paying for McVeigh's drinks on April 8, 1995, just three days after McVeigh's suspicious phone call. Two more women in Kansas reported that McVeigh and Brescia were frequent associates, while Guthrie bore a distinct physical resemblance to "John Doe Number Two". McVeigh's sister, Jennifer, also claimed that he had been one of the participants in several, unspecified bank robberies.

David Paul Hammer, a convicted murderer who was imprisoned with McVeigh at the United States Penitentiary, Terre Haute, has alleged that McVeigh told him details of the Oklahoma City bombing that contradict the account related in court. According to Hammer, McVeigh claimed to have been working as a deep cover operative for the US Department of Defense, having infiltrated ARA and participated in several of the group's bank robberies. McVeigh is further alleged to have indicated Strassmeir and several others at Elohim City were similarly government agents involved in surveillance of extremist elements of the American far-right.

Donna Langan
Langan was born Peter Kevin Langan in 1958 on Saipan in the South Pacific Islands. She grew up in Vietnam, where her father served in the military and CIA, before moving to the United States when Langan was 6 years old. In 1974, at age 16, Langan was sentenced to up to 20 years for robbing a man of $78 and fleeing police. Langan moved to Ohio in 1988, where she converted to Mormonism and became an ordained minister at what authorities describe as a Ku Klux Klan-affiliated church. During the early 1990s, Langan and her childhood friend Richard Guthrie formed the Aryan Republic Army, a white supremacist group with motives to overthrow the US government. The group turned to robbing banks in order to fund their movement. On January 18, 1996, the FBI arrested Langan. Langan, a transgender woman, who publicly renounced her political and racist views, served 18 years in a male prison before being transferred to a female penitentiary after a legal fight in 2014 during the Obama administration. In 2017, Langan and 435 other transgender inmates from federal prisons led an LGBT activist group in an effort to challenge the Trump administration's positions regarding transgender prisoners.

Other members and associates

Richard Lee Guthrie Jr.
Nicknamed "Wild Bill", Richard Lee Guthrie Jr. grew up within blocks of Langan in Wheaton, Maryland although they didn't become close until years later. After getting kicked out of the Navy in 1983 for painting a swastika on the side of a ship and threatening superiors, Guthrie attended gatherings of the Aryan Nations and traveled the country distributing Christian Identity propaganda.

Guthrie pled guilty in 1996 to three bank robberies in Ohio, and to 16 more in seven states, as well as to weapons charges and credit card fraud. Following a plea agreement, he was to provide authorities with information about terrorist organizations similar to the Aryan Republican Army. On July 12 of that same year, prison officials found Guthrie hanging in his cell, an apparent suicide.

Michael William Brescia

A resident of Elohim City and a former student at LaSalle University in Philadelphia, Michael William Brescia was recruited for the ARA by  Aryan Nations Pennsylvania state leader, Mark W. Thomas. Brescia was named in a lawsuit filed by the grandparents of a victim of the bombing as being "John Doe 2" seen with McVeigh in the days prior to the bombing. A female friend of McVeigh also identified Brescia and as friend of McVeigh's known only as "Mike".

Shawn Kenny
A 1991 Oak Hills High School graduate and one-time Aryan Nations member from Cincinnati, Shawn Kenny already had a racist background prior to being befriended by Langan at a law seminar. Kenny, himself, says he had discussed recruiting robbers with Thomas in 1994.

Despite his criminal history and alleged relationship with Timothy McVeigh, he joined the U.S. Army sometime after the ARA was dissolved and investigation into the Oklahoma City bombing had taken place.

Scott Anthony Stedeford
Growing up in a middle-class town in Pennsylvania, Stedeford was introduced to the Christian Identity Doctrine and then fell in with the revolutionary movement. During this time, he was also the founding member and frontman of the RAC band, Day of the Sword. Guthrie says to have met Stedeford through Berks County right-wing leader, Mark Thomas.

Mark William Thomas
A member of both the Aryan Nations and Ku Klux Klan, Thomas was ordained an Identity Minister during a stay at Aryan Nations' Idaho headquarters in 1990.

After being indicted in January 1997, Thomas told reporters that at least one gang member was involved in the Oklahoma bombing, according to a newspaper clip in FBI files.

Kevin McCarthy
A native Pennsylvanian, Kevin "Blondie" McCarthy spent his adolescence experimenting with drugs before eventually becoming a resident of the Elohim City compound in the fall of 1994. McCarthy was also the bass player for Stedeford's group, Day of the Sword.

Under a plea agreement, McCarthy became a government witness and testified in a pre-trial hearing against Langan in Columbus, Ohio.

Chevie Kehoe

A fellow white supremacist and resident of the Elohim City compound, Chevie Kehoe was contracted by the Aryan Republican Army to assassinate the Mueller family. The Mueller family were brief residents of Elohim City that had been privy to information dealing with the alleged connection of the Aryan Republican Army to the Oklahoma City bombing. Prior to murdering the Mueller family (with his accomplice Daniel Lewis Lee), Chevie had sold guns to the ARA.

Dennis Mahon

While his exact connection to group has not been revealed, white supremacist Dennis Mahon is known to have been close friends with members of the Aryan Republican Army during his stay at Elohim City.

A handful of videos were taken which depict Dennis Mahon engaging in paramilitary training alongside Andreas Strassmeir and Carol Howe, as well as a few other individuals which have not been identified. The unidentified militants in the footage may be some members of the Aryan Republican Army, since they lived at Elohim City around the same time that the video was recorded. In addition to this, the anonymous persons are seen wearing balaclavas in some videos, while in others, they either sport camouflage face paint or are simply too far away from the camera for them to be seen in detail.

Sentences

Popular culture
In 2010, the Aryan Republican Army was the subject of episode 82 of the television series Gangland.

Notes

References

External links 
Terrorist incidents attributed to the ARA on the START terrorism database

Organizations established in 1992
Organizations disestablished in 1996
American bank robbers
Christian Identity
Neo-Nazi organizations in the United States
Neo-fascist terrorism
Oklahoma City bombing
White-supremacist organized crime groups in the United States
White nationalist terrorism